Metal Max: Wild West was an announced standalone sequel to Metal Max Xeno: Reborn, for the PlayStation 4 and Nintendo Switch, and was to be co-developed by Kadokawa Games, Cattle Call, and 24Frame. It was announced on June 9, 2022, that Kadokawa Games would be discontinuing development of the title.

References 

Kadokawa Shoten games
Xeno: Reborn 2
PlayStation 4 games
Nintendo Switch games
Role-playing video games
2020 video games
Video games developed in Japan
Video game sequels
Cattle Call (company) games